Staithes railway station was a railway station on the Whitby Redcar and Middlesbrough Union Railway, serving the villages of Staithes and Dalehouse in North Yorkshire, England. It was opened on 3 December 1883.

History

The station was host to a LNER camping coach from 1935 to 1939 and may have had a coach visiting in 1934 and 1935. A coach was also positioned here by the North Eastern Region of British Railways from 1954 to 1958. A goods shed, steam crane and sidings were located on the west side of the station, with a south facing connection. Normally, fish vans were attached to passenger trains to forward their cargo out of the village, however, if the amount of landed fish justified it, special trains were laid on just for the fish traffic.

The station closed on to all traffic on 5 May 1958. The station building is now a private residence and is located next to the modern-day main car park for the village.

Immediately to the north west of the station the railway passed over Staithes Viaduct, built in 1875 but not opened to railway traffic until 1883 along with the rest of the railway. Following closure of the line, the viaduct was demolished in 1960. A plaque near the site of the viaduct details the history of both the structure and the railway.

Services
In 1896, the normal daily pattern was six trains each way. Four of the southbound trains continued past Whitby and onto Scarborough, with the other two terminating at Whitby Town. This general pattern of services continued through the following years, though some alterations occurred at Whitby, with most trains going south to Scarborough and connecting with a shuttle at Whitby West Cliff. During the Second World War the service was reduced to four services each way, with only two originating or terminating at Scarborough, and there were no services on Sundays. 

After the Second World War, some expresses went through the station without stopping. However, the 1946 timetable shows an increase to eight daily services with two on Sundays. By the early 1950s, at least one southbound express called at Staithes, with 14 daily workings.

References

Sources

Further reading

External links

 Staithes station on navigable 1955 O. S. map
 

Disused railway stations in the Borough of Scarborough
Former North Eastern Railway (UK) stations
Railway stations in Great Britain opened in 1883
Railway stations in Great Britain closed in 1958